The Premio Lydia Tesio is a Group 2 flat horse race in Italy open to thoroughbred fillies and mares aged three years or older. It is run at Capannelle over a distance of 2,000 metres (about 1¼ miles), and it is scheduled to take place each year in late October.

History
The event is named in memory of Lydia Tesio, the wife of Federico Tesio. For a period it was restricted to fillies aged three or four. It was given Group 2 status in 1975.

The race was first promoted to Group 1 level in 1977, but it was relegated back to Group 2 in 1988. It was opened to five-year-old mares in 1990, and its upper age limit became unrestricted in 1992.

The Premio Lydia Tesio regained Group 1 status in 2004. Its recent sponsors have included Darley, Shadwell and Longines.

From 2017 to 2018 the Premio Lydia Tesio is Italy's only remaining Group 1 race. It downgraded to Group 2 at 2019.

Records
Most successful horse:
 no horse has won this race more than once since 1968

Leading jockey since 1968 (4 wins):
 Fabio Branca - Quiza Quiza Quiza (2011), Charity Line (2013), Final Score (2014), Sound Of Freedom (2016)

Leading trainer since 1968 (4 wins):
 Sergio Cumani – Dobrowa (1969), Dudinka (1973), Grande Nube (1975), Time and Life (1976)

Leading owner since 1968 (3 wins):
 Scuderia Cieffedi – Dudinka (1973), Grande Nube (1975), Time and Life (1976)
 Scuderia Effevi - Charity Line (2013), Final Score (2014), Sound Of Freedom (2016)

Winners since 1980

 The 2008 running was cancelled because of a strike.

Earlier winners
 1968: Atala
 1969: Dobrowa
 1970: Croda Rossa
 1971: Black Dragoness

 1972: Ciacoleta
 1973: Dudinka
 1974: Orsa Maggiore
 1975: Grande Nube

 1976: Time and Life
 1977: Zabarella
 1978: Giustizia
 1979: Azzurrina

See also
 List of Italian flat horse races

References
 Racing Post:
 capannelleippodromo.it – Albo d'Oro – Premio Lydia Tesio.
 galopp-sieger.de – Premio Lydia Tesio.
 horseracingintfed.com – International Federation of Horseracing Authorities – Premio Lydia Tesio (2017).
 pedigreequery.com – Premio Lydia Tesio – Roma Capannelle.

Middle distance horse races for fillies and mares
Horse races in Italy
Sports competitions in Rome